Orick (formerly, Arekw, Orekw, and Oreq, Yurok:  'O'rekw ) is a census-designated place situated on the banks of the Redwood Creek in Humboldt County, California. The population was 357 at the 2010 census.

Rare minerals orickite and coyoteite were discovered at Coyote Peak near Orick.

History
O'rekw means "mouth of the river" in Yurok.  Orick evolved from the original word.  The Yurok people had 74 known villages in the area, O'rekw was one of five where jumping dances were held. At times spelled Or'eQw, it is important to note that there is no "Q" in the living Yurok people's alphabet.

Non-native settlers arrived with the Gold Rush, beginning in 1850 after the Josiah Gregg expedition discovered Humboldt Bay. Orick was settled not only for being on the way to mining claims in the Trinity, but for five beach sand mining claims fronting several miles of beach in the Gold Bluff District.  The gold sands did not produce well, and the local gold rush was over by the 1870s.

The first post office at Orick opened in 1887.

The earliest wagons traveled along the beaches, but in 1894 the county - that time covering both the modern Humboldt and Del Norte counties - finished a wagon road between Eureka and Crescent City.

Lumbering removed the trees in and around Orick and dairy farmers utilized the flood plain.  Until a bridge was built in 1903, Redwood Creek was always crossed by Swan's Ferry.

Robert Swan was a local rancher and businessman who owned the ferry and the local store, which was bought out by native Eurekan Elmer L. Devlin (August 1, 1877 - ?) who built the original Orick Inn. Devlin's first building burned down in 1918 and was rebuilt by 1922. It was known for home cooked food, as well as hosting fishermen and notables including opera singer Madame Ernestine Schumann-Heink, actors Fred MacMurray and Ronald Colman and President Herbert Hoover.

In 1924, the Redwood Highway reached Orick and by the 1930s connected all the way from San Francisco to Oregon.  Tourists arrived to see the giant redwoods.

After World War II, Orick became a lumber and timber mill town in response to the post-war demand for timber.  The business boomed for about fifteen years until closed by the  consolidation of mills in larger towns and foundation of the Redwood National Park.

Elephant Historical Plaque
On October 1, 1927, a circus elephant named "Big Diamond" collapsed five miles north of Orick after freeing ten "Honest Bill Animal Show" trucks mired in the new highway construction.  Honest Bill told a highway contractor that the elephant's skin was valuable and that the contractor could keep the money if he would remove the remains.  The contractor skinned and buried the elephant, but the skin turned out to be useless.  Many years later, the elephants bones were unearthed, and originally misidentified as a mammoth, but newspaper morgues found and repeated the story of Big Diamond's demise.  A memorial plaque was placed near where the bones were found in May 1993 by E Clampus Vitus Eureka Chapter 101.

Geography
Orick is part of the California Coast Range, lying close to the Pacific Ocean along U.S. 101. It is bisected by Redwood Creek.

The Orick/Gold Bluff Beach district runs about  along the beach at Orick.  Placer mining started in 1852 and continued until the 1880s during which time the district yielded more than $10 million value.  Gold here is found in black sands at the beach and east of the beaches; its source may be sorted from materials brought down the Klamath River which arrives in the Pacific twenty miles north of Orick.

Redwood Creek Flood Control Project- Humboldt County
Floods in 1950, 1953, 1955 and 1964 resulted in channel enlargement, excavation and the construction of earthen levees along each side of the lower  Redwood Creek (Humboldt County) by the U.S. Army Corps of Engineers during 1966 to 1968 to protect the community of Orick. An error was made within the construction. Fault was admitted shortly after the completion. Observation shows this design flaw invades the Redwood Creek estuary. This unwarranted annexation causes extreme damage to the ecosystem. The estuary sits at the western end of the flawed levee system known as the Redwood Creek Flood Control Project- Humboldt County (RCFCP- Humboldt County).The system is maintained by Humboldt County which determined that a general investigation is needed by USACE to consider reworking the system to a more natural condition while retaining flood control benefits.

Climate
This region experiences warm (but not hot) and dry summers, with no average monthly temperatures above 71.6 °F.  According to the Köppen Climate Classification system, Orick has a warm-summer Mediterranean climate, abbreviated "Csb" on climate maps. There is on average  of precipitation in a year, making it a very wet mediterranean climate.

Demographics

The 2010 United States Census reported that Orick had a population of 357. The racial makeup of Orick was 288 (80.7%) White, 0 (0.0%) African American, 39 (10.9%) Native American, 0 (0.0%) Asian, 3 (0.8%) Pacific Islander, 6 (1.7%) from other races, and 21 (5.9%) from two or more races. Hispanic or Latino of any race were 20 persons (5.6%).

The Census reported that 346 people (96.9% of the population) lived in households, 11 (3.1%) lived in non-institutionalized group quarters, and 0 (0%) were institutionalized.

There were 166 households, out of which 33 (19.9%) had children under the age of 18 living in them, 60 (36.1%) were opposite-sex married couples living together, 10 (6.0%) had a female householder with no husband present, 13 (7.8%) had a male householder with no wife present.  There were 20 (12.0%) unmarried opposite-sex partnerships, and 1 (0.6%) same-sex married couples or partnerships. 65 households (39.2%) were made up of individuals, and 19 (11.4%) had someone living alone who was 65 years of age or older. The average household size was 2.08.  There were 83 families (50.0% of all households); the average family size was 2.69.

The population's ages were spread out, with 60 people (16.8%) under the age of 18, 23 people (6.4%) aged 18 to 24, 84 people (23.5%) aged 25 to 44, 125 people (35.0%) aged 45 to 64, and 65 people (18.2%) who were 65 years of age or older.  The median age was 48.1 years. For every 100 females, there were 113.8 males.  For every 100 females age 18 and over, there were 116.8 males.

The homeowner vacancy rate was 2.2%; the rental vacancy rate was 8.2%.  198 people (55.5% of the population) lived in owner-occupied housing units and 148 people (41.5%) lived in rental housing units.

These numbers have decreased almost by half in the last six years. The current estimated population is under 185 residents.

Economy
Orick is surrounded by state and national parks and is on several trail networks in the Redwood National and State Parks, as well as the Redwood Creek Estuary Trail, the Humboldt Lagoons trails, the California Coastal Trail, and the Pacific Coast Bicycle Route.

Tourists visit in both the dry and the wet seasons with attendance averaging 35,000 a month (low of 13,631 February, high of 70,215 August) in 2010. About 20 percent seek local lodging by camping or lodging in the parks.

Parks and recreation
Redwood National Park Thomas H. Kuchel Visitor Center is located on US Highway 101 just before reaching Orick, California. The Redwood National Park Southern Operation Center (SOC) is located directly in town on US Highway 101 across the road from the local market and US Post Office.

Government

Education
Orick is served by the Orick Elementary School with grades K-8, but faces closure regularly due to low enrollment.

Infrastructure
Orick is served by U.S. Highway 101 and smaller county roads.

Water is provided to the  Redwood National Park Visitors’ Center by the district. Orick Community Hall is maintained by the district.

In popular culture
The community was featured in the PlayStation 3 video game Resistance 2.

The town is briefly seen in the 2018 film Jurassic World: Fallen Kingdom, a few miles away from the Lockwood Estate where the auction of the last dinosaurs takes place.

See also
Prairie Creek Redwoods State Park
 
 Orick Peanut

References

Census-designated places in Humboldt County, California
Census-designated places in California
Populated coastal places in California